Ihor Oleksiyovych Duhinets (Igor Alekseyevich Duginets; born May 20, 1956 in Kuibysheve, Crimean) is a retired male Soviet-Ukrainian discus thrower.

He set his personal best on August 21, 1982 at a meet in Kiev, throwing 68.52. He won the silver medal at the 1982 European Championships in Athletics in Athens, Greece.

References

 
 Year List
 Short Profile
 Statistics
 sports-reference

Ukrainian male discus throwers
Soviet male discus throwers
Athletes (track and field) at the 1980 Summer Olympics
Olympic athletes of the Soviet Union
European Athletics Championships medalists
1956 births
Living people
People from Bakhchysarai Raion